General elections were held in South Africa on 19 June 1924 to elect 135 members of the House of Assembly. Considered a realigning election, rising discontent with the government of Jan Smuts led to the defeat of his government by a coalition of the pro-Afrikaner National Party and the South African Labour Party, a socialist party representing the interests of the white proletariat.

Smuts had angered South African nationalists by his moderate stance on South African independence from the British Empire. The worldwide depression after the end of the First World War had led to a strike in South Africa, known as the Rand Rebellion, which had been defused through a combination of military force and negotiation with the outgunned unions, earning Smuts the enmity of the labour vote. As a consequence Smuts's SAP was defeated by a Nationalist–Labour Pact, James Hertzog formed the government and became Prime Minister – a position he was to hold until 1939.

Delimitation of electoral divisions
The South Africa Act 1909 had provided for a delimitation commission to define the boundaries for each electoral division. The representation by province, under the fourth delimitation report of 1923, is set out in the table below. The figures in brackets are the number of electoral divisions in the previous (1919) delimitation. If there is no figure in brackets then the number was unchanged.

Results

References
South Africa 1982: Official Yearbook of the Republic of South Africa, published by Chris van Rensburg Publications

General elections in South Africa
South Africa
June 1924 events